Charles Wallis may refer to:

Charles Edward Wallis (1869–1927), physician and dental surgeon in London
Charles Glenn Wallis (died 1944), American poet and translator
Charles Wallis (MP), for Duleek
Charles Braithwaite Wallis, List of ambassadors of the United Kingdom to Panama

See also
Charles Wallace (disambiguation)